Harold Brown may refer to:

Harold Brown (Tuskegee Airman) (1924–2023), U.S. Air Force officer and Tuskegee Airmen fighter pilot, World War II prisoner of war (POW)
Harry Brown (journalist) (Harold Andrew Brown, 1930–2002), Canadian radio and television host
Harold K. Brown (born 1934), San Diego civil rights activist
Harold L. Brown (born 1946), Pennsylvania politician
Harold P. Brown (1857–1932), American inventor, anti-alternating current activist
Harold Brown (basketball) (1923–1980), American basketball player
Harold Brown (Secretary of Defense) (1927–2019), American physicist, U.S. Secretary of Defense 
Harold Ray Brown (born 1946), American drummer, member of the 1970s band War 
Harold Brown (athlete) (1917–2002), Canadian athlete
Harold Brown (footballer) (1878–1940), Australian rules footballer for Essendon and St Kilda
Harold Brown (gymnast) (1904–1986), British Olympic gymnast
Harold Brown (Rhode Island financier) (1863–1900), American financier, philanthropist, and prominent member of New York society
Harold Brown (ice hockey) (1920–1997), Canadian ice hockey right winger
Harold Brown (film preservationist) (1919–2008), British pioneer in the science of film preservation
Harold Brown (Royal Navy officer) (1878–1968), English engineer with the Royal Navy
Harold Brown, main character in Harry Brown
 J. Harold Brown (1902–1982), American composer

See also
Harry Brown (disambiguation)
Harold Browne (1811–1891), British bishop
Harry Browne (1933–2006), American writer, politician, investment analyst, and Libertarian Party Presidential nominee